Torgunsky is a rural locality (a settlement) in Baranovskoye Rural Settlement, Nikolayevsky District, Volgograd Oblast, Russia. The population was 116 as of 2010.

Geography 
Torgunsky is located in steppe on the left bank of the Volgograd Reservoir, 91 km east of Nikolayevsk (the district's administrative centre) by road. Melovoy is the nearest rural locality.

References 

Rural localities in Nikolayevsky District, Volgograd Oblast